Tabernacle Chapel may refer to:

Tabernacle Chapel, Aberystwyth
Tabernacle Chapel, Cardiff, a Grade II*-listed building
Tabernacle Chapel, Llandovery, a Grade II*-listed building
Tabernacle Chapel, Llanelli, a Grade II*-listed building
Tabernacle Chapel, Morriston, a Grade I-listed building